The Sara language is a language spoken in Kalimantan in Indonesia by about 200 people.

References

Languages of Indonesia
Land Dayak languages
Endangered Austronesian languages